Markus Remes (born 26 April 1954) is a Finnish sports shooter. He competed in the mixed skeet event at the 1976 Summer Olympics.

References

1954 births
Living people
Finnish male sport shooters
Olympic shooters of Finland
Shooters at the 1976 Summer Olympics
Sportspeople from Oulu